The Nikon D5300 is an F-mount DSLR with a  carbon-fiber-reinforced polymer body and other new technologies, announced by Nikon on October 17, 2013. It is a mid-range camera with a crop sensor and requires a minimum camera 8.3 raw plugin for Photoshop to process its .NEF files. 

It features the Expeed 4 processor and is the company's first DSLR with built-in Wi-Fi and GPS. It shares the same 24-megapixel image sensor as its D5200 predecessor, but without an anti-aliasing (AA) filter, equal to the Nikon D7100. MSRP for the body is $800, and $1,400 with an 18-140mm f/3.5-5.6 kit lens. The camera replaces the D5200 and is replaced by the Nikon D5500.

Features 

Expeed 4 with lower power consumption; extended battery life to 600 shots
Full HD video 1080p with auto focus also in uncompressed video (clean HDMI at 60p,30p,24p only) format. Nikon's first DSLR with 60p/50p framerate at full HD resolution (several previous Nikon bodies supported 60p/50p, but only at 720p)
 Assisted GPS built-in ("A-GPS" Almanac files downloadable from Nikon)
 WLAN (Wi-Fi) built-in
 Automatic correction of lateral chromatic aberration for JPEGs. Correction-data is additionally stored in raw files and used by Nikon Capture NX, View NX and some other raw tools.
No Anti-aliasing (AA) filter
New pentamirror with 0.82x magnification and 95% frame coverage
 Nine special effects
 Active D-Lighting (four-level and auto).
 Bracketing (exposure, Active D-Lighting and white-balance).
 In-camera HDR mode.
 Inbuilt time-lapse photography intervalometer
 Quiet shooting mode.
 Built-in sensor cleaning system (vibrating low-pass filter) and airflow control system.
 HDMI HD video output.
 Enhanced built-in raw processing with extended Retouch menu for image processing without using a computer: D-Lighting, Red-eye reduction, Trimming, Monochrome & filter effects, colour balance, Image overlay, NEF (raw) processing, Quick retouch, Straighten, Distortion control, Fisheye, colour outline, colour sketch, Perspective control, Miniature effect, Selective colour, Edit movie, Side-by-side comparison.
 Stereo microphone input (has stereo built-in mic)
 articulated 1073k-dot vari-angle LCD.
EN-EL14 or EN-EL14A Lithium-ion Battery.
Slightly smaller and lighter body (480 g) than its predecessor

Like Nikon's other consumer level DSLRs, the D5300 has no in-body auto focus motor, and fully automatic auto focus requires one of the currently 166 lenses with an integrated auto focus motor. With any other lenses the camera's electronic rangefinder (which indicates if the subject inside the selected focus point is in focus or not) can be used to manually adjust focus.

The D5300 can mount unmodified A-lenses (also called Non-AI, Pre-AI or F-type) with support of the electronic rangefinder and without metering.

See also 
 Nikon D5500
 List of Nikon F-mount lenses with integrated auto focus motors

References

External links 

 Nikon D5300 Product Page at Nikon Global
 Nikon D5300 Manual:  Nikon

D5300
D5300
Live-preview digital cameras
Cameras introduced in 2013